Gundeshapur (Weh-Andiōk-Šābuhr; New Persian: , Gondēshāpūr) was the intellectual centre of the Sassanid Empire and the home of the Academy of Gundishapur, founded by Sassanid king Shapur I. Gundeshapur was home to a teaching hospital and had a library and a centre of higher learning. It has been identified with extensive ruins south of Shahabad, a village 14 km south-east of Dezful, to the road for Shushtar, in the present-day province of Khuzestan, southwest Iran.

It is not an organised archaeological place as of today, and except for ruins, it is full of remains like broken ceramics.

Despite the fame, recently some scholars have called Gundeshapur's overall historical importance, specifically, the existence of its hospital, into question.

The town fell into decline after the Muslim conquest of Persia, the city surrendering in 638.  However, it continued to remain an important centre in the Muslim period. Ya'qub ibn al-Layth al-Saffar, the founder of the Saffarid dynasty, made Gundeshapur his residence three years before his sudden death in 879. His tomb became one of the most prominent sites in the city.

Name
The Middle Persian word Gondēšāpūr (or Gundēšāpūr) is a corrupted form. It may be from wandēw Šāpūr, means "acquired by Shapur", or from Gund-dēz-i Shāpūr, means "military fortress of Shapur", or from Weh-Andiyok-Shāpūr, "Better-than-Antioch of Shapur". In the Kurdish language, "Gund", means Village, and Shapur was a Sasanian King, therefore, it is translated as Shapur's Village. The origin of the Sasanian Kings were originated form the Kurdish family bloodline. 

In Classical Syriac, the town was called  Bēth Lapaṭ,; in Greek Bendosabora; in  Jundaysābūr; and in New .

The Rise of Gundeshapur

After his conquest of the Roman city of Antioch in 256, the Sasanian King of Kings (shahanshah) Shapur I founded the city of Gundeshapur, situated between Susa and Shushtar. The city, constructed as a place to settle Roman prisoners of war, subsequently became a Sasanian royal winter residence and the capital of the Khuzistan province. Gundeshapur was one of the four main cities of the province, along with Susa, Karka d-Ledan, and Shushtar. Gundeshapur was mainly inhabited by Christians, and served as the East-Syrian metropolitan see of Bet Huzaye.

Most scholars believe Shāpur I, son of Ardeshir (Artaxexes), to have founded the city after defeating a Roman army led by Emperor Valerian.  Gundeshapur was a garrison town and housed many Roman prisoners of war. Shāpur I made Gundeshapur his capital.

Shāpur's wife, the daughter of Aurelian, lived in the capital with him. She brought with her two Greek physicians who settled in the city and taught Hippocratic medicine.

In 489, the Nestorian theological and scientific center in Edessa was ordered closed by the Byzantine emperor Zeno, and transferred itself to become the School of Nisibis or Nisibīn, then under Persian rule with its secular faculties at Gundeshapur, Khuzestan. Here, scholars, together with Pagan philosophers banished from Athens by Justinian in 529, carried out important research in medicine, astronomy, and mathematics".

It was under the rule of the Sassanid monarch Khusraw I (531-579 CE), called Anushiravan "The Immortal" and known to the Greeks and Romans as Chosroes, that Gundeshapur became known for medicine and erudition. Khusraw I gave refuge to various Greek philosophers, Nestorian Assyrians fleeing religious persecution by the Byzantine empire.

The king commissioned the refugees to translate Greek and Syriac texts into Pahlavi. They translated various works on medicine, astronomy, astrology, philosophy, and useful crafts.

Anushiravan also turned towards the east, and sent the famous physician Borzouye to invite Indian and Chinese scholars to Gundeshapur. These visitors translated Indian texts on astronomy, astrology, mathematics and medicine and Chinese texts on herbal medicine and religion. Borzouye is said to have himself translated the still popular Indian Pañcatantra from Sanskrit into Persian as Kelile væ Demne.

Many Assyrians settled in Gundeshapur during the Fifth century. The Assyrians were most of all medical doctors from Urfa, which was during that time, home to the leading medical center. Teaching in the Academy was done in Syriac until the city fell to Muslim Arab armies, which destroyed the city and places of learning.

Gundeshapur under Muslim rule 
The Sassanid dynasty fell to Muslim Arab armies in 638 CE. The academy survived the change of rulers and persisted for several centuries, by projecting itself as a Muslim institute of higher learning. In 832 CE, Caliph al-Ma'mūn founded the Bayt al-Hikma, the House of Wisdom.  There the methods of Gundeshapur were emulated since the House of Wisdom was staffed with graduates of the older Academy of Gundeshapur who had been trained heavily in Indian and some Greek and Iranian medical traditions. It is believed that the House of Wisdom was disbanded under Al-Mutawakkil, Al-Ma'mūn's successor who felt learning conflicted with the information given in the Quran. In addition, the intellectual center of the Abbasid Caliphate had shifted to the Arab stronghold of Baghdad, as henceforth there are few references in contemporary literature to universities or hospitals at Gundeshapur.

Gundeshapur had been major link between Indian and some Greek medicine, because of its previous practices of combining the medical traditions, therefore the transition from earlier ancient civilisations to later Islamic appropriation was more coherent.

The last attested head of the Gundeshapur hospital was Sābur bin Sahl who died in 869. The fate of the hospital after this is unknown.

Recent academic doubts 

Some scholars have cast doubts on the existence of the hospital at Gundeshapur by claiming that there are no known surviving Persian sources "that would corroborate the claims that [Gundeshapur] played a crucial role in medical history". It has been assumed that a medical center at Gundeshapur would have resembled the School of Nisibis. What is more likely is there existed a seminary, like the one in Nisibis, where medical texts were read, and an infirmary, where medicine was practiced.

Additionally, Gundeshapur's reputation may have been conflated with that of Susa, a city to the west of Gundeshapur and with which Gundesahur was administratively linked.  Ath-Tha'ālibi, a scholar with access to Sassanian royal annals, discussing pre-Islamic Persia, wrote:
 On the other hand, the same source might be another confirmation of the medical reputation of Gundeshapur as Susa may represent the whole local region which included Gundeshapur (as they were administratively linked). This is enforced by the fact that Ahwāz and Fārs, mentioned in the quote for comparison to Susa, were regions as well, an indication that regions were being compared.

See also 

 Science in Persia
 List of hospitals in Iran
 School of Nisibis
 Sarouyeh

Further reading

 Piyrnia, Mansoureh. Salar Zanana Iran. Maryland: Mehran Iran Publishing, 1995.

Notes

References

 

 
 
 

271 establishments
Populated places established in the 3rd century
Sasanian cities
Former populated places in Khuzestan Province
Persian words and phrases
Shapur I